The 1940 United States Senate election in Minnesota took place on November 5, 1940. Incumbent U.S. Senator Henrik Shipstead defected to the Republican Party of Minnesota from the Farmer–Labor Party of Minnesota, and defeated former Governor Elmer Benson of the Farmer–Labor Party and John E. Regan of the Minnesota Democratic Party to win a fourth term.

Democratic primary

Candidates

Declared
 Louis Erickson
 John E. O'Rourke, Former Minnesota State Representative from the 27th district (1935-1937)
 John E. Regan, 1932 Democratic gubernatorial nominee and former Minnesota State Representative from the 8th district (1931-1933)
 Joseph Wolf

Results

Farmer–Labor primary

Candidates

Declared
 Elmer A. Benson, 24th Governor of Minnesota (1937-1939) and former U.S. Senator (1935-1936)
 George H. Lommen, Minnesota State Senator from the 61st district since 1927

Results

Republican primary

Candidates

Declared
 Ben Andreen
 Ray P. Chase, Former U.S. Representative (1933-1935) and 9th Minnesota State Auditor (1921-1931)
 Michael Ferch
 O. J. Hagen
 Asher Howard, Former Minnesota State Representative from the 34th district (1917-1923)
 Martin A. Nelson, 1934 and 1936 Republican gubernatorial nominee (unsuccessful)
 Henrik Shipstead, Incumbent U.S. Senator since 1923
 Engelberth Zeiner

Results

General election

Results

See also 
 United States Senate elections, 1940 and 1941

References

Minnesota
1940
1940 Minnesota elections